Joseph Kerr (1765–1837) was a United States senator from Ohio.

Joseph Kerr may also refer to:

Joseph Kerr (Canadian politician) (died 1902), merchant and politician from Ontario, Canada
Joseph Kerr (Wisconsin politician) (died 1855), American politician
Joe Kerr, an alias used by the DC Comics character Joker